Shuga Records is a Chicago-based record store and record label specializing in new and vintage rock, punk, indie, hip-hop, EDM, Shoegaze, Psychedelic, Noise, Metal, Neo Soul, collectible, and obscure vinyl records, cassettes and CDs.

History

Retail operations 
The first retail location of Shuga Records opened in 2004 in Eden Prairie, Minnesota. In 2007 Shuga Records moved its retail location to Minneapolis, Minnesota, where it operated until 2012. Shuga Records currently operates its retail store and mail-based shipping business in the Wicker Park neighborhood of Chicago. The Chicago location opened for business in February 2015.  Shuga Records maintains an extensive warehouse and retail presence with over half a million records.  In May 2016 Shuga Records expanded into a second story loft apartment which is used as a warehouse space for online operations.

Record label 
The "Shuga Records" record label was started in 2016. The debut release for the label was a self-titled vinyl reissue from the Chicago-based band Ne-Hi. Chicago music acts such as Mungion and Max Loebman have also released through the Shuga Records Label.

In 2017 Shuga Records announced the release of Multi-Tone Chicago Vol. 1: Max and Adam's Picks, a compilation album featuring songs from thirteen Chicago musical artists. The record is scheduled for release in June 2017.

Recent activities

Noteworthy acquisitions 
In 2014 an extremely rare Velvet Underground acetate record featuring early recordings of songs later to be featured on The Velvet Underground & Nico was put up for auction on eBay through Shuga Records. Only two copies of the record are known to exist.

Special events 
Shuga Records often hosts special in-store events such as live concerts and artist record signing events. Some of the artists and bands who have had events at Shuga records are Boris, King Gizzard and the Lizard Wizard, and Schoolboy Q. The stage inside Shuga Records previously belonged to Atomic Records where bands such as Nirvana and Smashing Pumpkins had performed on it. In addition to artist events, Shuga Records annually participates in Record Store Day as well a pop-up shop at Pitchfork Music Festival. During its operation in Minneapolis, Minnesota, Shuga Records annually hosted "Hoolie Fest," a live concert festival featuring over 75 bands and artists.

Artists who have performed or participated in in-store event for Shuga Records include:
 Boris
 BØRNS
 The Foreign Resort
 GRIZFOLK
 Hello Ocho
 Jukebox the Ghost
 Kikagaku Moyo
 King Gizzard and the Lizard Wizard 
 Kweku Collins 
 Ne-Hi 
 The Ready Set 
 Schoolboy Q 
 The Wonder Years 
 X Ambassadors 
 Yelawolf 
 Yoko and the Oh No's 
 Pete Yorn

Discography and exclusives 
Albums released and reissued on vinyl under the Shuga Records label include:
 Ne-Hi - Ne-Hi (Exclusive Reissue) 
 Mungion - Scary Blankets
 Max Loebman - Wild One

See also 

Online music store
Record collecting
Record Label
Vinyl Record

References

External links 
  – Official site
 – Discogs Store
  – eBay store
  – Amazon store
  – Musicstack store
  – CD & LP store

Business and industry organizations based in Chicago
Music retailers of the United States
Online music stores of the United States
Reissue record labels